"Lost in Yesterday" is a song by Australian psychedelic music project Tame Impala. It is the eighth track on the 2020 album The Slow Rush, and was released as its fourth single on 8 January 2020. The song was written by Kevin Parker, who performed all instruments and vocals.

The single reached number one on Billboards Adult Alternative Songs chart, becoming Tame Impala's first song to top an airplay chart in the United States. It also peaked at number 78 on the Irish Singles Chart, number 2 on the Billboard Alternative Songs chart, becoming their highest-charting song on the chart, and number 5 on the Hot Rock Songs chart.

The song was voted into fifth place on the Australian Triple J Hottest 100 of 2020, which was broadcast on 23 January 2021.

The song was nominated for Song of the Year and Most Performed Alternate Work at the APRA Music Awards of 2021

Music video
The official music video was directed by Terri Timely and initially depicts an awkward, glum shotgun wedding reception with an unhappy and pregnant bride. The same scene is replayed multiple times, but each repetition portrays a happier and livelier version of the event; the original bride is replaced by a woman in a beautiful wedding dress, a disengaged man watching TV is replaced by a man clapping for the happy couple, and paper cups are replaced by champagne flutes. The last extravagant iteration is suddenly interrupted by the original bride and mother who threaten the new replacements and cameraman, breaking the fourth wall.

The video is a metaphor for nostalgia and how it can inaccurately improve perceptions of bad memories over time, referencing the song's lyric "eventually terrible memories turn into great ones."

Charts

Weekly charts

Year-end charts

Certifications

References

External links
 

2020 singles
2020 songs
Songs about nostalgia
Song recordings produced by Kevin Parker
Songs written by Kevin Parker (musician)
Tame Impala songs